Afrocantharellus splendens is a species of fungus in the family Cantharellaceae. First described in 1994 as a species of Cantharellus, it was transferred to the new genus Afrocantharellus in 2012.

References

External links

Cantharellaceae
Fungi described in 1994
Fungi of Africa